Tédié or Tédjé (Fulfulde: Teje; Dogon: Tɛ́ːⁿ) is a rural commune of the Cercle of Douentza in the Mopti Region of Mali. The commune contains 12 villages and in the 2009 census had a population of 6,733. The principal village (chef-lieu) is Tongo-Tongo.

Tédié consists of a cluster of villages in rugged part of plateau, including the villages of Tongo Tongo, Andji, and Tangadiye. Tommo So is spoken in Tédié. The local surname is Ouologuem.

References

External links
.

Communes of Mopti Region